Alberto Martín was the defending champion but lost in the quarterfinals to Markus Hantschk.

Joan Balcells won in the final 6–4, 3–6, 7–6(7–1) against Hantschk.

Seeds
A champion seed is indicated in bold text while text in italics indicates the round in which that seed was eliminated.

  Mariano Puerta (second round)
  Karim Alami (first round)
  Stefan Koubek (first round)
  Francisco Clavet (first round)
  Magnus Gustafsson (second round)
  Alberto Martín (quarterfinals)
  Albert Portas (quarterfinals)
  Álex Calatrava (semifinals)

Draw

References
 2000 Gelsor Open Romania Singles Draw

2001 Singles
Singles
2000 in Romanian sport